The Fugitive is a 1925 American silent Western film directed by Ben F. Wilson and starring Ruth Stonehouse, Wilbur McGaugh and Joseph W. Girard.

Cast
 Ruth Stonehouse as The Girl
 Wilbur McGaugh as Yaqui Kid
 Ben F. Wilson as The Man 
 Natalie La Supervia as Lolita Mendez
 Joseph W. Girard asSatan Saunders 
 Helene Rosson as The Sister

References

Bibliography
 Connelly, Robert B. The Silents: Silent Feature Films, 1910-36, Volume 40, Issue 2. December Press, 1998.
 Munden, Kenneth White. The American Film Institute Catalog of Motion Pictures Produced in the United States, Part 1. University of California Press, 1997.

External links
 

1925 films
1925 Western (genre) films
1920s English-language films
American silent feature films
Silent American Western (genre) films
American black-and-white films
Films directed by Ben F. Wilson
Arrow Film Corporation films
1920s American films